Jamar Kendric Nesbit (born December 17, 1976) is a former American football guard. He was signed by the Carolina Panthers as an undrafted free agent in 1999. He played college football at the University of South Carolina. Nesbit has also played for the Jacksonville Jaguars and New Orleans Saints.

He was suspended for four games during the 2008–2009 season for using a performance-enhancing drug. He had been using StarCaps, which contained the illegal loop diuretic bumetanide, which is used to mask steroids or performance-enhancing drugs (PEDs). While serving his suspension, he lost his starting job to Carl Nicks. In 2010, Nesbit sued the NFL, claiming that they knew that bumetanide was in StarCaps, but they did not notify any of the players.

High school and college career
He played football  at Summerville High School and was part of the Green Wave for John McKissick, the winningest American football coach.
He played college football at the University of South Carolina.

Professional career

Carolina Panthers
After going undrafted in the 1999 NFL Draft, he signed as a free agent with Carolina Panthers.

Jacksonville Jaguars
In 2003, he signed with the Jacksonville Jaguars.

New Orleans Saints
He signed with the New Orleans Saints. In 2009, Nesbit won his first Super Bowl ring with the New Orleans Saints.

References

1976 births
American football offensive guards
Carolina Panthers players
Doping cases in American football
Jacksonville Jaguars players
Living people
New Orleans Saints players
South Carolina Gamecocks football players
People from Summerville, South Carolina